Sandhyakku Virinja Poovu is a 1983 Indian Malayalam-language drama film written by Thoppil Bhasi and directed by P. G. Viswambharan. It is based on the 1980 novel of the same name by P. R. Shyamala. The film features Mammootty, Shankar, Seema, Mohanlal, Prathapachandran and Adoor Bhasi in major roles. The film did well commercially.

Plot

Dr. Baladevi (Seema) is a gynecologist. She lost her parents at a young age and is deeply attached to her only brother Thilakan (Shankar).  Thilakan gets an opportunity to pursue his study in U.S. As he was about to depart, he tells Baladevi about his girlfriend Subhashini and wanted Baladevi to take care of her.

The twist comes when Subhashini informs Baladevi that she was raped by a man and is pregnant. She wants Baladevi to abort her child. However, she dies during the MTP surgery and Baladevi gets into an allegation and legal case related to that death. A case is filed by Subhashini's cousin Ramu (Mohanlal), who also tries to blackmail Baladevi for money.

Baladevi is helped by Adv. Jayamohan (Mammootty), who has a weakness for ladies. The verdict came in favour of Baladevi, who eventually falls for Jayamohan, whose lifestyle changes after involving in a relation with her. Meanwhile, Jayamohan also reveals that Subhashini has had relations with many men including him, and Ramu was a pimp, not a cousin to her.

Cast
 Mammootty as Advocate Jayamohan
 Shankar as Thilakan
 Seema as Dr. Baladevi
 Mohanlal as Ramu
 Adoor Bhasi as Panikkarammavan  
 Uma Bharani as Subhashini
 Ambika as Priya
 Prathapachandran as Nambiar 
 Sukumari as Jayamohan's mother 
 Y. Vijaya as Sumitra friend of Baladevi
 V. D. Rajappan as a Sumitra’s husband and common friend of Jayamohan and Baladevi

Soundtrack
The film features three songs written by noted poet O. N. V. Kurup and composed by Ilaiyaraaja.

Reception
On 4 March 1983, The Hindu wrote, "Century Productions' latest offering Sandhyakku Virinja Poovu directed by P. G. Vishwambaran succeeds in presenting the sentimental story of a doctor. Consequently, it also marks a departure from Vishwambaran's earlier films." the same day The Indian Express wrote, "While director P. G. Vishwambaran has excelled in his directorial role, he is supported by a tight screenplay and crisp dialogues by Thoppil Bhasi which makes the film pacy and towards the end highly suspenseful" further writing "Seema, as Dr. Bala gives a stand out performance, being particularly impressive in highly emotional sequences. She is matched in acting by Mammootty, who is advocate Jayamohan."

Legacy 
In 2017, The Times of India described Mammootty's role as one of the "astounding advocate roles he has given life to". Seema herself rated her role of Dr. Baladevi in Sandhyakku Virinja Poovu and as the teenage prostitute in Avalude Ravukal as her best.

References

External links
 
 Sandhyakku Virinja Poovu at the Malayalam Movie Database

1980s Malayalam-language films
1983 films
1983 drama films
Films scored by Ilaiyaraaja
Films based on Indian novels
Films with screenplays by Thoppil Bhasi
Films directed by P. G. Viswambharan